San Bruno Park Elementary School District was created in 1906 in San Bruno, California to meet the needs of a growing population following the San Francisco earthquake and fire.

History
The first public school in San Bruno, California, known as the "Old Tin School House," was built on El Camino Real with volunteer labor. The first school year, 1906–07, had an enrollment of 44 students. A bond election in 1907 raised $1,000 for the district.

Edgemont Elementary School, a two-story structure was built on a large lot bounded by Elm, Acacia, and Jenevein avenues. The building also housed the district offices. With the completion of this building, in November 1910, the "Old Tin School House" served as a municipal building, known as Green Hall. It  eventually became San Bruno's first city hall in 1914, when the city was incorporated.

An additional elementary school, North Brae Elementary School, was opened in 1912.  An annex was added to Edgemont Elementary School in the early 1930s to accommodate the rapidly growing school population in San Bruno.

With the passage of the Field Act by the California legislature, following the devastating 1933 Long Beach earthquake, steps were taken to seismically upgrade existing schools or close them. However, the upgrading or closing of California's public schools took many years, since the State of California left funding to the districts.

San Bruno's population increased to 3,610 in 1930 and exceeded 6,000 in 1940, encouraging the district to build another school.
In 1941, the New Edgemont Elementary School was built a block west of the district's offices, at 875 W. Angus Avenue.  Additional classrooms were added in 1946.  New offices, a cafeteria (with a stage), and a kindergarten building (now the media center) were built in 1956.

With the postwar building boom, more schools were built in San Bruno.  The district's third school, El Crystal, was built on a small hill overlooking San Bruno City Park in 1948; it had additional classrooms added during the 1956–57 school year, when some students attending New Edgemont were bused to the school to relieve overcrowding at New Edgemont.

Belle Air Elementary School was opened in 1951 in the lowlands of San Bruno, near Mills Field (renamed San Francisco International Airport in 1954).

The district's first intermediate school, housing San Bruno's seventh and eighth grade students, was Parkside, which opened in 1954 on Niles Avenue.  This school was expanded over the years.  In 1973 gymnasiums, lockers, and showers were added at Parkside.

With the development of the massive Rollingwood and Crestmoor subdivisions in western San Bruno in the 1950s, the district built additional elementary schools.  The first of these, Rollingwood Elementary School, opened in 1956.  Next came two schools in the Crestmoor district, both on Crestmoor Drive: Crestmoor Elementary School in 1957, followed by John Muir Elementary School in 1960 (named for the famous naturalist who lived for many years in Martinez, California).

In late 1957, following damage to Edgemont Elementary School by the 1957 San Francisco earthquake on March 22, the school board decided to close the building, demolish it, and replace it with new classrooms and offices.  With the completion of the new facility, New Edgemont Elementary School was renamed Decima Allen Elementary School, to honor a beloved librarian.  Decima M. Allen was San Bruno's librarian from 1937 to 1955, overseeing the construction of the present main library next to the city hall in 1954; she also served on the school board for 25 years and was president of the Edgemont PTA.

The district's final elementary school was Carl Sandburg Elementary School (named after Carl Sandburg), built in the Rollingwood district.  At the official dedication of the school in December 1961, the famous poet and historian came for the ceremonies.  As a San Bruno Herald reporter observed, Sandburg looked around at the school's children, smiled, and audibly marveled at their young faces.

The school district also built another intermediate school, in Crestmoor Canyon, to honor former school superintendent Willard Engvall (1898–1983).  This school opened in 1962.  Gymnasiums were added to both intermediate schools in 1973.

Falling school enrollments in San Bruno in the 1970s and 1980s forced the school district to begin closing some of the schools.  Eventually, North Brae Elementary School, Carl Sandburg Elementary School, and Engvall Intermediate School were closed.  The buildings were later demolished and the land sold to developers.

In March 1996, the voters of San Bruno approved a $600,000 bond for seismic improvements to the schools.  There was an education summit for all members of the community in March 1998.  Then, in April 1998, the voters approved a $30 million bond for the renovation and modernization of the schools.  During the 1999–2000 school year, the district began offering child care at each school.  A state preschool program was begun at Belle Air in 2000.

The Portola Elementary School, located in the city's northwestern corner, had long been part of the Laguna Salada School District, headquartered in Pacifica, California.  Built in 1964, the school became part of the San Bruno Park Elementary School District in July 2000. In 2013, it was decided that Crestmoor Elementary School would be closed due to low attendance. In 2018, it was decided that El Crystal and Rollingwood would close, due to financial difficulties being experienced by the district.

School superintendents
 Eugene Knight, July 1921 – June 1922
 Henry C. Hall, September 1922 – May 1944
 Willard R. Engvall, June 1944 – June 1959
 George Lawry, July 1959 – June 1971
 William Jennings, July 1971 – November 1978
 Dr. Robert Rottman, January 1979 – June 1980
 Dr. John Mehl, July 1980 – August 1991
 Dr. Theresa Daem, October 1991 – June 1998
 Dr. Donna Elder, August 1998 – July 2002
 Dr. David E. Hutt, November 2002 – June 2015
 Cheryl Olson, July 2015 – 2017 
 Stella M. Kemp, Ed.D., August 2017 - Present

Schools today
Belle Air (opened 1951)
Crestmoor (opened 1957, closed 2013)
Decima Allen (opened 1941; expanded 1946 and 1956)
El Crystal (opened 1948; expanded 1956, closed 2018)
John Muir (opened 1960)
Parkside (opened 1954)
Portola (opened 1964)
Rollingwood (opened 1956)

External links

References

School districts in San Mateo County, California
School districts established in 1906
1906 establishments in California
San Bruno, California